Dillinger & Young Gotti is the second studio album by rap group Tha Dogg Pound. It was released independently on D.P.G. It debuted at #124 on the billboard charts. Another Dogg Pound album was released that year. Death Row Records released 2002, a collection of unreleased material recorded by Tha Dogg Pound while they were signed to the label.

A promotional 16-track CDM under the same title was also released. It featured 4 songs off the LP in different versions: "Dipp With Me", "Gangsta Like" (without Xzibit's verse) - radio/radio a cappella/album/album a cappella/instrumental; "Party At My House", "You Justa Bitch" - radio/album/instrumental.

Track listing
All songs produced by Daz Dillinger and Mike Dean

Charts

Weekly charts

References

2001 albums
Tha Dogg Pound albums
Albums produced by Daz Dillinger
Albums produced by Mike Dean (record producer)